Giovanni Andrea Fava (born 10 June 1952 in Valdagno) is an Italian psychiatrist and professor of clinical psychology at the University of Bologna. He is also a clinical professor of psychiatry at the University at Buffalo School of Medicine and Biomedical Sciences.

Education and career
Fava received his medical degree from the University of Padova in 1977, where he went on to complete his residency in psychiatry in 1981. After working for several years in the US (Albuquerque and Buffalo, N.Y.), he returned to Italy in 1988, becoming Associate Professor of Psychosomatic Medicine in the Department of Psychology of the University of Bologna, while keeping his ties with the State University of New York at Buffalo.  He has been a professor of clinical psychology at the University of Bologna since 1997 and a clinical professor of psychiatry at the University at Buffalo's School of Medicine since 1999. Since 1992, he has been the editor-in-chief of the peer-reviewed medical journal Psychotherapy and Psychosomatics.

Research
Fava has authored more than 500 scientific papers and performed  research in several fields. His main areas of interest have been diagnosis and treatment of affective disorders and  psychosomatic medicine. Fava is known for researching the adverse effects of antidepressant drugs, such as their potential to trigger a relapse among depressed patients. In a 1994 editorial, he argued that many of his fellow psychiatrists were too hesitant to question whether a given psychiatric treatment was more harmful than it was helpful. He has also studied hypochondriasis and how it can be treated, and the frequency with which patients with medical illnesses become demoralized about their condition. 

He has also developed well-being therapy, a therapy aimed at preventing patients recovering from depression from relapsing.  It has been described as a method to promote psychological resilience.

References

External links
Faculty page

Italian psychiatrists
1952 births
Living people
Academic staff of the University of Bologna
University of Padua alumni
Medical journal editors
University at Buffalo faculty